The 2018–19 Yeovil Town F.C. season was the 16th season in the Football League played by Yeovil Town Football Club, an English football club based in Yeovil, Somerset. It was a part of the 2018–19 English football league season.

Background

The 2017–18 season was the club's third consecutive in the fourth tier of the English football league system, it was Darren Way's second full season in charge as manager. After losing their opening game by a record 8–2 score line away at Luton Town. The club's league season had few highpoints as they spent all but one week of the season in the lower half of the table and was typified by indiscipline with the club receiving ten red cards during the course of the season and on three occasions being reduced to nine men. The Glovers did record their record away victory in the Football League in April with a 6–2 win at Coventry City. Despite indifferent form safety was confirmed with two matches to spare as Yeovil finished the season in 19th place. In cup competitions Yeovil had more success reaching the fourth round of the FA Cup for only the fourth time in their history, beating two League One sides to get there, before losing at home to eventual runners-up Manchester United. In the EFL Cup the Glovers lost in the first round against Championship side Wolverhampton Wanderers, while in the EFL Trophy the club reached the semi-finals, losing to Shrewsbury Town having beaten three League One sides to reach that stage.

The end of the season saw Way release four players, including the experienced trio of Artur Krysiak, Ryan Dickson and Nathan Smith. Three players were offered new contracts, with goalkeeper Stuart Nelson quickly agreeing a new two-year contract. While midfielder Oscar Gobern rejected the offer of a new deal to sign for National League side Eastleigh, The summer also saw goalkeeper Jonny Maddison agree to terminate his contract to sign for National League North side Darlington. In late June, the club received a bid in the region of £100,000 which met the release clause of attacking midfielder Otis Khan from fellow League Two side Mansfield Town, Khan subsequently signed a two-year contract with the Nottinghamshire side. Defender Omar Sowunmi returned to the club for pre-season training having still not signed a new contract.

Review

Pre-season

The first day of pre-season saw the arrival of four new signings, defenders Carl Dickinson and Gary Warren arrived on two-year contracts following their release from Notts County and Inverness Caledonian Thistle. While goalkeeper Nathan Baxter joined on loan from Chelsea and forward Diallang Jaiyesimi signed on loan until the end of the season from Norwich City. On 5 July, Yeovil confirmed that defender Omar Sowunmi had signed a new two-year contract ending transfer speculation, while midfielder Connor Smith agreed to terminate his contract before signing for National League side Boreham Wood. Prior to Yeovil's first match of pre-season the club confirmed the return of former midfielder Paul Terry as the club's new first-team coach. Yeovil's first friendly of the season saw the visit of Championship side Swansea City, on 10 July. The Glovers' squad included eight trialists, including recently released full back Daniel Alfei, Yeovil took the lead through Green but eventually lost the match 2–1. Following the match the club confirmed that captain James Bailey would be out for the foreseeable future after having more surgery following medial ligament damage on Boxing Day, and midfielder Jake Gray would be missing until September due to ruptured ankle ligaments. On 13 July, Yeovil confirmed the signing of Beninese international midfielder Sessi D'Almeida on a one-year contract with an option to extend it for a further year following a successful trial period. The squad then headed to South Wales for a short training camp, on 14 July, Yeovil played a Bristol City XI side behind closed doors drawing 1–1 with trialist Korrey Henry scoring Yeovil's goal. The Glovers followed this up with a further 1–1 draw at home against League One side Bristol Rovers with Bevis Mugabi giving Yeovil the lead. The Glovers then faced another League One side Plymouth Argyle at Huish Park. Loanee Diallang Jaiyesimi scored the opener, before braces from Rhys Browne and Alex Fisher saw Yeovil run out 5–1 victors. Among the trialists in the Yeovil side was former Notts County winger and Martiniquais international Yoann Arquin, another of the trialists former West Ham United forward Korrey Henry signed an initial one-year contract. Yeovil then travelled the short distance to face Southern League Premier South side Dorchester Town, on 24 July. Goals from Aqruin and Henry earned the Glovers a 2–0 victory. On 27 July, Yeovil confirmed the signing of Brentford midfielder Reece Cole on loan until the end of the season. The first team concluded pre-season with a 3–0 victory over Southern League Division One Central side Corby Town, before a team consisting primarily of the club's under-18 beat local side Gillingham Town by the same scoreline. After a pre-season of rumours surrounding the future of versatile Welsh defender Tom James, the club confirmed they had accepted an undisclosed bid in the region of £400,000 from Championship side West Bromwich Albion. The move fell through the following day after James failed to agree personal terms with the Championship club. On 2 August, the club confirmed the signing of Martiniquais international Yoann Arquin on a six-month contract following a successful trial. The following day, Yeovil signed two more players with winger Wes McDonald signing following his release from Birmingham City and midfielder Alex Pattison on loan until the end of the season from Middlesbrough.

August
Yeovil started their League Two season with an away trip to relegated Bury, on 4 August. Before the match both goalkeeper Stuart Nelson and winger Rhys Browne suffered injuries which caused them to miss the start of the 2018–19 season. The Glovers were reduced to nine men, following the dismissals of Tom James for a second bookable offence and Jordan Green for serious foul play, and suffered a 1–0 defeat. On 11 August, Yeovil faced Mansfield Town in their first home match of the season. Yeovil took the lead twice through Diallang Jaiyesimi and Yoann Arquin's first goals for the club but the Glovers were twice pegged back to draw 2–2 with all four goals scored in the first 26 minutes. Yeovil then faced Championship side Aston Villa in the EFL Cup first round, Yeovil thought they had taken the lead just before half-time when Jaiyesimi poked in at the back post but it was disallowed for a "foul" in the build-up and saw striker Alex Fisher have his penalty saved by Villa goalkeeper André Moreira. Villa's Conor Hourihane knocked Yeovil out with a late winner. The match also saw the Glovers give a debut to youth player Gabriel Rogers who became the first player born in the 2000s to play for the Yeovil senior team. On 17 August, Yeovil secured their first win of the season with a 4–0 victory away at Notts County, courtesy of a hat-trick from Alex Fisher and a fourth from former Notts County player Yoann Arquin. Yeovil extended their unbeaten run to three league matches with a goalless draw against Oldham Athletic, on 21 August. After only featuring in two matches for the club Brentford loanee Reece Cole's loan was terminated by mutual consent. On 25 August, Yeovil won their first home match since February with a 2–0 victory over previously unbeaten Stevenage, with first-half goals from Alex Fisher and Sessi D'Almeida securing the victory. In the days prior to the closing of the loan transfer window, Yeovil secured the signing of forward Omari Patrick on loan from Bradford City on loan until January, Luxembourg international defender Enes Mahmutovic on a season-long loan deal from Middlesbrough. Finally, forward Olufela Olomola returned to the club on loan until January from Scunthorpe United.

September

The start of September, saw the club announce the postponement of their clash with Milton Keynes Dons due to international call-ups, with midfielder Sessi D'Almeida receiving a call-up to the Benin national team for the first time since 2015, defenders Enes Mahmutovic called up to Luxembourg and Shaun Donnellan called up to the Republic of Ireland U21 side.

Transfers

Transfers in

Transfers out

Loans in

Loans out

Match details

League Two

League table

FA Cup

EFL Cup

EFL Trophy

Group table

Squad statistics
Source:

Numbers in parentheses denote appearances as substitute.
Players with squad numbers struck through and marked  left the club during the playing season.
Players with names in italics and marked * were on loan from another club for the whole of their season with Yeovil.
Players listed with no appearances have been in the matchday squad but only as unused substitutes.
Key to positions: GK – Goalkeeper; DF – Defender; MF – Midfielder; FW – Forward

Suspensions

Footnotes

A.  Exeter City won 4–3 in a penalty shootout following a 0–0 draw in normal time.

See also
 2018–19 in English football
 List of Yeovil Town F.C. seasons

References

2018–19 EFL League Two by team
2018-19